Muthuiyankaddu Kulam ( Muttu'aiyaṉkaṭṭu Kuḷam) is an irrigation tank in northern Sri Lanka, approximately  north west of Oddusuddan.

History
The tank on Per Aru was earlier knowns as Muthu Rayan Kaddu Kulam and Man Malai.

There was a  spill on the right bank. The left and right bank sluices were each 3 ft 3 in by 4 ft 6 in. By 2014 the tank was capable of irrigating .

References

Irrigation tanks in Sri Lanka
Bodies of water of Mullaitivu District
Lakes of Sri Lanka